The following is a list of Gold Coast Suns leading goalkickers in each of their seasons in the Australian Football League.

AFL

AFLW

References
General

 

Specific

Goalkickers
Australian rules football-related lists
Gold Coast, Queensland-related lists